San Pablo de Buceite is a  village located in the province of Cádiz, Spain.

Populated places in the Province of Cádiz